Edwin Dudley Greene is a Republican member of the North Carolina House of Representatives who has represented the 85th district (including all of Avery, McDowell, and Mitchell counties) since 2021.

Committee assignments

2021-2022 session
Appropriations - Justice and Public Safety 
Families, Children, and Aging Policy 
Judiciary II (Vice chair)
Local Government - Land Use, Planning and Development 
State Personnel (Vice chair)
Appropriations

Electoral history

References

Living people
Year of birth missing (living people)
Republican Party members of the North Carolina House of Representatives
21st-century American politicians